Eastern Sporting Union, generally known as ESU, is an Indian professional football club based in Imphal, Manipur. It's women's team competed in the Indian Women's League. Eastern Sporting Union is one of the most successful women's football club in India, and champion of the inaugural Indian Women's League.

History
Founded on 14 March 1946, Eastern Sporting Union by the public leaders of East Imphal tehsil under the patronage of HH Bodhchandra Singh is one of the oldest clubs in Manipur.

Team records

Seasons

2018 women's squad

Technical staff

Honours

Domestic tournaments

Cup
 Churachand Singh Trophy
Champions (3): 1967, 1972, 2002–03
Runners-up (1): 1974
Kohima Royal Gold Cup
Runner-up (1): 1992

Women's team
Indian Women's League
Champions (1): 2016-17
Runners-up (1): 2017-18
 Manipur Women's League
 Champions (5): 2014, 2015, 2017, 2021, 2022–23

References

External links
 Team profile at All India Football Federation

Football clubs in Manipur
Association football clubs established in 1946
Women's football clubs in India
Imphal